The Mazafran River is a river, with an estuary, in Algeria, North Africa.

About  in length, the river passes through an area covered in woodlands, and some evidence of the Roman land ownership patterns are still discernable. The river, which flows into the Mediterranean, forms part of the border of the wilaya of Tipaza.

It is created by the confluence of the Chiffa River and the Djer River, and although not navigable, has been used traditionally for irrigation.

References

Rivers of Algeria
Bodies of water of Algeria
Landforms of Algeria